Circuit reliability (also time availability) (CiR) is the percentage of time an electronic circuit was available for use in a specified period of scheduled availability.  Circuit reliability is given by where T o is the circuit total outage time, Ts is the circuit total scheduled time, and T a is the circuit total available time.  

In addition, circuit reliability is the expected lifespan of operation of a functioning system under nominal conditions.

References

Electrical engineering